The women's 500 metres race of the 2011 World Single Distance Speed Skating Championships was held on 13 March at 12:00 (Round 1) and 13:30 (Round 2) local time.

Results

References

2011 World Single Distance Speed Skating Championships
World